Ammonium phosphate refers to three different chemical compounds, all of which are formed by the reaction of ammonia with phosphoric acid and have the general formula [NH4]x[H3−xPO4], where 1 ≤ x ≤ 3:
 Ammonium dihydrogenphosphate, [NH4][H2PO4]
 Diammonium phosphate, [NH4]2[HPO4]
 Ammonium phosphate, [NH4]3[PO4]

Ammonium compounds
Phosphates
Chemistry set index articles